William Lozado (born May 12, 1959) is an American former professional baseball infielder. Lozado played with the Milwaukee Brewers of Major League Baseball in 1984. Following the season he was selected in the Rule 5 draft by the St. Louis Cardinals but was released the following year. Previously, he had been drafted by the Detroit Tigers and Minnesota Twins, but did not sign with either team.

Lozado played at the college level at Miami-Dade Community College.

References

1959 births
Living people
American expatriate baseball players in Canada
Arkansas Travelers players
Burlington Bees players
Denver Zephyrs players
El Paso Diablos players
Indianapolis Indians players
Louisville Redbirds players
Major League Baseball infielders
Memphis Chicks players
Miami Dade Sharks baseball players
Milwaukee Brewers players
Oklahoma City 89ers players
Baseball players from New York City
Stockton Ports players
Vancouver Canadians players
American expatriate baseball players in Italy
Parma Baseball Club players